The Thomas–Kilmann Conflict Mode Instrument (TKI) is a conflict style inventory, which is a tool developed to measure an individual's response to conflict situations.

Development
A number of conflict style inventories have been in active use since the 1960s.  Most of them are based on the managerial grid developed by Robert R. Blake and Jane Mouton in their managerial grid model. The Blake and Mouton model uses two axes: "concern for people" is plotted using the vertical axis and "concern for task" along the horizontal axis. Each axis has a numerical scale of 1 to 9. These axes interact so as to diagram five different styles of management. This grid posits the interaction of task with relationship and shows that according to how people value these, there are five basic ways of interacting with others.

In 1974, Kenneth W. Thomas and Ralph H. Kilmann introduced their Thomas–Kilmann Conflict Mode Instrument (Tuxedo NY: Xicom, 1974).

Description
The Thomas–Kilmann Conflict Mode instrument consists of thirty pairs of statements. For each pair, the respondent must choose either the A or B item (for example, one item depicts collaborating while the other item describes avoiding). Each pair of statements was specifically designed, through a multi-stage research process, to be equal in social desirability.

The TKI uses two axes (influenced by the Mouton and Blake axes) called "assertiveness" and "cooperativeness." The TKI identifies five different styles of conflict: Competing (assertive, uncooperative), Avoiding (unassertive, uncooperative), Accommodating (unassertive, cooperative), Collaborating (assertive, cooperative), and Compromising (intermediate assertiveness and cooperativeness).

In a 1978 published analysis of 86 responses, Thomas and Kilmann determined that the TKI exhibited moderate test-retest repeatability, moderate internal consistency (measured by Cronbach's alpha), and low to moderate correlation with three other instruments.

The TKI is held under copyright and is not publicly available or accessible to be conducted without being purchased for each individual assessment. Paper copies for purchase by the Myers Briggs Company (the current copyright holder) cost $21.95 USD per copy, and an on-line administered assessment with 90 days download access costs $45 USD.

The instrument is often used by students in conflict management classes or workshops. It has aso been used in psychological studies -- for example, to compare the conflict attitudes of college athletes and non-athletes.

One criticism of the instrument was that it was given so often in employment situations, as one newspaper columnist wrote in 1993, "I’ve taken the test so many times I know what answers will get the desired outcome." Others praise the TKI as a reliable, valid measure of personality.

References
11. Kenneth W. Thomas & Ralph H. Kilmann (1974) , "Conflict Mode Instrument, "XICOM Incorporated, 33rd Printing 1991

Dispute resolution
Personality tests